Saint-Nicolas or Saint-Nicolas-lez-Arras (literally Saint-Nicolas near Arras) is a commune in the Pas-de-Calais department in the Hauts-de-France region of France.

Geography

Lipperode, a part of Lippstadt, in Germany is the twin town of St-Nicolas-lez-Arraz.

Population

Places of interest
 The church of St.Nicholas, rebuilt, along with the rest of the commune, after World War I.
 Traces of an old castle.

Notable people
Jean Bodel, poet

See also
Communes of the Pas-de-Calais department

References

External links

 Official website of Saint Nicolas Lez Arras 

Saintnicolas